The tetralemma is a figure that features prominently in the logic of India.

Definition
It states that with reference to any a logical proposition X, there are four possibilities:

  (affirmation)
  (negation)
  (both)
  (neither)

Catuskoti
The history of fourfold negation, the Catuskoti (Sanskrit), is evident in the logico-epistemological tradition of India, given the categorical nomenclature Indian logic in Western discourse. Subsumed within the auspice of Indian logic, 'Buddhist logic' has been particularly focused in its employment of the fourfold negation, as evidenced by the traditions of Nagarjuna and the Madhyamaka, particularly the school of Madhyamaka given the retroactive nomenclature of Prasangika by the Tibetan Buddhist logico-epistemological tradition. Though tetralemma was also used as a form inquiry rather than logic in the nasadiya sukta of rigveda (creation hymm) though seems to be rarely used as a tool of logic before buddhism

See also
 De Morgan's laws 
 Paraconsistent logic
 Prasangika
 Two-truths doctrine
 Catuṣkoṭi, a similar concept in Indian philosophy

References

External links
 Wiktionary definition of tetralemma
 Twelve links blog Notes on the tetralemma

History of logic
Logic
Lemmas